Nazlu (also Romanized as Nāzlū) is a village in Nazluchay Rural District, Nazlu District, Urmia County, West Azerbaijan Province, Iran. At the 2006 census, its population was 1,311, in 328 families.

Urmia University
The main campus of Urmia University is located in South of Nazlu.

References 

Populated places in Urmia County